Sanjeev Gupta is professor of Earth Science at Imperial College London.

Gupta is part of the NASA Mars Science mission, particularly the Curiosity rover mission currently exploring Gale Crater.

References

External links
  British Library: Voices of Science

Living people
British geologists
Academics of Imperial College London
NASA people
Year of birth missing (living people)
Planetary scientists